One Fair Summer Evening was Nanci Griffith's seventh album, and her first one recorded in a live setting. It was recorded on August 19 and August 20, 1988 at Anderson Fair, a Houston, Texas club long known for featuring folk artists in an intimate setting.

Griffith mainly performed live versions of songs from her previously released albums, but added in a couple of new ones: "Deadwood, South Dakota" and "I Would Bring You Ireland". The album rose into the #43 position of the Billboard Country Albums chart.

Critical reception

AllMusic'''s Lindsay Planer gave the album 4½ out of a possible 5 stars and began the review with, "This is singer/songwriter Nanci Griffith's first live album, and it captures the essence of what has endeared Griffith to fans of both folk and cosmopolitan country. Although One Fair Summer Evening was not an immediate phenomenon at the cash registers, the revealing nature of the performance has secured it a place in the hearts of enthusiasts since its release in 1988."

Jon Cummings of PopDose wrote, "Stripped of most of the country elements that had been ladled over their studio versions, Griffith’s songs emerge crisp and timeless; indeed, these live recordings accomplish the rare feat of rendering their studio antecedents obsolete."

Track listing

Personnel
 Nanci Griffith - acoustic guitar, lead vocals
 Denny Bixby - bass guitar
 Denice Franke - backing vocals
 James Hooker - keyboards
 Doug Hudson - harmony vocals
 Denise Franke - harmony vocals
Eric Taylor, James Hooker, Denny Bixby - harmony vocals on "Love at the Five and Dime"

Production
Producers - Nanci Griffith and Tony Brown
Associate Producer - Buzz Stone
Engineer - Phillip Barrett
Assistant Engineer - Steve Lowney, Andy Vastola
Second Engineers - Marty Williams, Mark J. Coddington
Mastered by - Glenn Meadows
CD Master Tape Prepared by - Glenn Meadows
Digital Editing - Milan Bogdan
Art Direction - Simon Levy
Design - Virginia Team/Jerry Joyner
Photography - Peter Nash

Track information and credits adapted from Discogs and AllMusic'', then verified from the album's liner notes.

Chart performance

References

Nanci Griffith albums
1988 live albums
Albums produced by Tony Brown (record producer)
MCA Records live albums